The Machtey Award is awarded at the annual IEEE Symposium on Foundations of Computer Science (FOCS) to the author(s) of the best student paper(s). A paper qualifies as a student paper if all authors are full-time students at the date of the submission. The award decision is made by the Program Committee.

The award is named after Michael Machtey, who was a researcher in the theoretical computer science community in the 1970s. The counterpart of this award at the ACM Symposium on Theory of Computing (STOC) is the Danny Lewin Best Student Paper Award.

Past recipients 
Past recipients of the Machtey award are tabulated below.

See also

 List of computer science awards
Kleene award

References

Awards established in 1981
Computer science awards
IEEE awards
Student awards